Cheilosia semifasciata is a Palearctic hoverfly.

Description
External images For terms see Morphology of Diptera
Cheilosia semifasciata has a very low facial knob, (in line with the bottom of the eyes),  hairy eyes, dark legs with pale knees and dark antennae. Males have square grey dust spots each side of tergites 2 to 5.
See Schmid, U. (2000) for certain determination
The larva is described and figured by Rotheray  (1994).

Distribution
Norway and Finland South to northern France. From Ireland East across mountains of Central Europe, Romania and Bulgaria.

Habitats
Scree slopes, cliffs and rock outcrops up to 2000m. and gardens where the host plants are cultivated.

Biology
A leaf miner of Saxifraga, Sedum and Umbilicus. Adults visit the flowers of Alliaria petiolata, Allium ursinum, Anemone nemorosa, Prunus spinosa, Ranunculus, Salix, Taraxacum and Vaccinium myrtillus flying in March to early June.

References

Diptera of Europe
Eristalinae
Insects described in 1894